The Nebelung is a rare pedigree breed of domestic cat. Nebelungs have long bodies, wide-set green eyes, long and dense fur, and mild dispositions. The cat is related to the Russian Blue, but with longer, silkier hair, and is in fact sometimes called the Long-haired Russian Blue.

Origin

The American foundation of this cat breed was laid by the cats Siegfried (1984) and Brunhilde (1985). Cora Cobb, the owner of Siegfried and Brunhilde, was very impressed by the beauty of her blue-grey cats. Siegfried and Brunhilde looked like a Russian Blue but with a semi-long coat. To find out if it was possible to start a new breed with these cats, Cora got in touch with the geneticist of the American Cat Association. This geneticist, Solveig Pfleuger, said that the breed was best defined as semi-long haired Russian Blue. Supported by Pfleuger, Cobb wrote the breeding standard according to the Russian Blue, but with a difference: its coat length.

Russian Blue breeders from The International Cat Association (TICA), however, objected to this, and the breed standard was thus revised to describe a unique breed, resembling blue-grey cats that had been imported from Russia in the nineteenth and early twentieth centuries.

TICA was the first association to recognize the Nebelung and provides the breed standard. The goal of the Nebelung breeding program is to produce a blue cat with the same type as those early Russian imports and to combine this type with a thick shimmering coat of medium length. The body and tail are long, the ears large in proportion to the head, and the eyes range in color from yellowish green to green. Size is medium and the body well-muscled. The coat is medium long on the body and longer on the tail, with lighter colored guard hairs. The overall appearance is long, sturdy and well muscled. The name Nebelung is derived from the German translation for "creature of the mist."

The Nebelung around the globe
The Nebelung is a rather new breed, with breeders in America, Canada, Russia, and Europe. In addition to TICA, the Nebelung is recognized by the American Cat Fanciers Association (ACFA), the World Cat Federation (WCF), Livre Officiel des Origines Félines (LOOF), and independent cat associations in the Netherlands, Belgium, and Germany. The breed's availability is still rather limited.

Characteristics

Physical characteristics 

Nebelung cats are characterized by a long, graceful neck and body, long legs, long or medium coat, and long tail. Slightly oval eyes are a vivid green color, or sometimes a yellow-green. Large, pointed ears sit atop a modified wedge-shaped head that is more pointed than rounded. The overall appearance is of a long, sturdy, well-muscled cat. The soft double coat feels fine and silky; it is gray in color and is tipped with silver. Males and, to a lesser extent, females have a ruff around the neck. The fur on the tail is longer than that on the body. Tufts of fur are found behind the ears and in between the toes, and the hind legs sport pantaloons. The adult coat reaches its full development when the cat is approximately two years old. The life span of a Nebelung is 16+ years. A Nebelung weighs between 3.5 kg (7.11 lbs) for females and 6.5 kg (14.5 lbs) for sterilized males.

Behavioral characteristics

Nebelung cats are lively, playful, affectionate, good-natured, and intelligent. The cat's mild-mannered state and personality may not always reflect the relatively high level of intelligence often found in the breed. In spite of the fact that it is an active cat, it can live very well indoors. Nebelungs prefer their own families and often keep a distance from strangers. They tend to bond with a select few humans and stay loving and devoted throughout their lives. It is, however, a cat that gladly accepts company of its people or of another cat. Nebelungs are very good communicators and will remind their owners of problems. This happens often since Nebelungs can be very picky about things such as litter cleanliness and food type. 

Many owners of Nebelung cats say that they can act more like dogs at times, being extremely loyal to their owner and family. At times a Nebelung may choose or bond with a specific person within a family group more so than others. They will still enjoy the company of others within the social group but will tend to spend most of their time with said chosen person. They are also known for being easily leash trained with use of a proper harness. It enjoys sitting in a lap and being petted, and will follow its favorite person devotedly from room to room. The breed is also very playful and is known to learn to fetch and retrieve toys when thrown. This is a cat that likes routine, and may require a little time to adjust to changes in the household. Early socialization can help it become more adaptable.

In popular culture
The Nebelung was featured on the Animal Planet show Cats 101. 

The character Hairball in the movie Pound Puppies and the Legend of Big Paw was a Nebelung voiced by Frank Welker.

The Nebelung is one of the animals which can be given as a Patronus in answer to the user's personality test on Pottermore.

In the movie Garden State, a Nebelung is featured in a scene with Zach Braff, Peter Sarsgaard and Jean Smart.

In the 1999 movie Go, a Nebelung is in multiple scenes with Timothy Olyphant, the dealer of drugs, Todd.

In the season 2 episode of Friends, "The One Where Eddie Moves In", a Nebelung portrays the eponymous cat in the music video for Smelly Cat.

In the season 3 episode of It's Always Sunny in Philadelphia, "Bums: Making a Mess All Over the City", a long-haired grey cat who looks like a Nebelung portrays "Special Agent Jack Bauer", an "indestructible" cat with a fondness for gasoline adopted from a junkyard to help guard Paddy's pub.

References

Cat breeds
Rare cat breeds